Guy Forget and Jakob Hlasek won in the final 2–6, 6–3, 6–4, against Udo Riglewski and Michael Stich.

Seeds

  Guy Forget /  Jakob Hlasek (champions)
  Udo Riglewski /  Michael Stich (final)
  Neil Broad /  Gary Muller (quarterfinals)
  Sergi Bruguera /  Goran Ivanišević (quarterfinals)

Draw

Draw

External links
Draw

Doubles